Angie Dickerson was a New York-based tenants' rights organizer involved in the Communist Party, and was under surveillance by the FBI. She was one of the members of Sojourners for Truth and Justice, a leftist, black feminist organization formed in 1951.

She was a member of the World Peace Council and advocated for US withdrawal from Vietnam and Korea. For the conference held in East Berlin of the World Peace Council from 21–23 June 1969 to convince the US to recognize the German Democratic Republic, Dickerson was sent 20 tickets for Aeroflot passage from New York City 
for conference attendees.

In 1970, Dickerson chaired, along with Ossie Davis, Dick Gregory and others, a National Emergency Conference to defend the right of the Black Panther Party to existence. Believing that the US Attorney was attempting to destroy the party, a wide group of church leaders, civil rights groups, labor groups and colleges sponsored the conference. The sponsors included: Ralph David Abernathy head of the Southern Christian Leadership Conference; Roy Innis, chairman of the Congress of Racial Equality; Irving Sarnoff of the Los Angeles Peace Action Council; and Rev. Quincy Cooper, of Black Methodists for Church Renewal.

References

Landlord–tenant law
Members of the Communist Party USA
African-American people
Real property law in the United States
Possibly living people
Year of birth missing